Eaton Constantine is a small village in the English county of Shropshire. It is located just off the B4380 road, between Atcham and Buildwas, near The Wrekin hill. It is part of the civil parish of Leighton and Eaton Constantine.

The theologian Richard Baxter (1615–1691) lived here in his boyhood. His childhood home, now called Baxter's House (a private residence), is a 16th-century timber-framed house in the centre of the village.

Near Eaton Constantine are the remains of a Roman vexillation fortress and three marching camps near a bend in the River Severn. The fortress lies in open farmland on a low south-eastward projecting spur between Ranslet House and Eye Farm. It was defended by a triple-ditch system measuring about 920 x 1,050 feet (c.280 x 320m) within the defences, which enclosed an area of just under 22¼ acres (c.9ha). This substantial defensive system indicates that this was no ordinary marching encampment, and its size would have been sufficient to house a substantial force of around 2,500 Roman legionaries and auxiliary soldiers. The fortress was probably occupied by a contingent of Legio XIV Gemina, together with a couple of auxiliary cavalry units.

Etymology
The place-name 'Eaton Constantine' does not refer to the Roman military presence; 'Eaton' means 'island town or settlement', and the land was held by Thomas de Cotentin from Cotentin (in Normandy) in 1242.

See also
Listed buildings in Leighton and Eaton Constantine

References

External links

Villages in Shropshire
Shrewsbury and Atcham